Lady Washington is a ship name shared by at least four different 80-100 ton-class Sloop-of-war and merchant sailing vessels during two different time periods. The original sailed during the American Revolutionary War and harassed British shipping.  Post war, the vessel was used as a merchant trading vessel in the Pacific. A somewhat updated modern replica was created in 1989. The replica has appeared in numerous films and television shows, standing in as other real or fictional ships.

Lady Washington (18th century original) 
The original USS Lady Washington was a 90-ton brig. Her early history is documented in the Massachusetts Soldiers and Sailors of the Revolutionary War as well as other documents. As part of the Columbia Expedition, she left Boston Harbor on October 1, 1787. She sailed around Cape Horn and participated in the maritime fur trade with the coastal indigenous people of the Pacific Northwest and in tea and porcelain across the Pacific in China. She was the first American-flagged vessel to round Cape Horn. She was the first recorded vessel to make landfall on the Oregon coast near Tillamook, Oregon. John Meares claimed that she was the first non-native vessel to circumnavigate Vancouver Island.

Named in honor of Martha Washington, she was captained during the American Revolutionary War by Naler Hatch, and post war by Robert Gray, and John Kendrick, former captain of her larger sailing partner, Columbia Rediviva and commander of the expedition. At the end of the first trading season, Kendrick ordered Gray to sail Columbia to China, while Kendrick took command of Lady Washington . Under the command of Kendrick, she was refitted in Macau as a brigantine.

Lady Washington became the first American vessel to reach Japan in an unsuccessful attempt to move some unsold pelts. Lady Washington remained in the Pacific trade and eventually foundered in the Philippines in 1797. She was lost at the mouth of the Mestizo River, near Vigan, northwest Luzon in July 1797.

Lady Washington (20th-century replica)

A ship replica of Lady Washington was built in Aberdeen, Washington, United States in time for the 1989 Washington State Centennial celebrations. Aberdeen is located on Grays Harbor, an inlet of the Pacific Ocean named for Robert Gray, the man who entered the harbor under sail for the first time as master of Columbia.

The ship was designed by marine expert Ray Wallace and built by Richard Miles. Wallace is also known for designing the Sailing Ship Columbia in Disneyland alongside Admiral Joe Fowler.

Named "Washington State's Tall Ship Ambassador", as well as the State Ship, the new Lady Washington is operated by a professional and volunteer crew under the auspices of the Grays Harbor Historical Seaport Authority. She sails up and down the Pacific coast, educating students in the history of merchant trading, life of common sailors, and responsibilities of the ship's officers.

The current replica's mainmast is rigged with a topgallant sail and topsail above a gaff mainsail, as based on the post-Macau refit configuration. Old World (UK/international) terminology refers to this sail plan as brigantine, and New World (American) terminology refers to this as a brig (Refer to the explanation sections on the brig, brigantine, and sail plan pages for more information).

This ship was talked about extensively on the Disney+ series Prop Culture. Episode four was all about Pirates of the Caribbean: Curse of the Black Pearl.

Film and television appearances
Lady Washington has appeared and served as a set in various films and television series.
 The HMS Interceptor in the film Pirates of the Caribbean: The Curse of the Black Pearl
 The brig Enterprise, a namesake of the Starship Enterprise, on the holodeck in Star Trek Generations.
 The ship used to transport Chinese immigrants to America in the IMAX film The Great American West.
 The ship played a prominent role in the miniseries Blackbeard.
 Captain Hook's ship Jolly Roger on Once Upon a Time,
 As a recurring background piece in Revolution.
 Was the reference ship for the computer animated RLS Legacy in the Disney film Treasure Planet, which was captained by Captain Amelia, the anthropomorphic cat.
 Appeared in S01 E04 of Prop Culture while talking about filming Pirates of the Caribbean: Curse of the Black Pearl.

Outside of film and television, the ship serves as the central visual element for the Christian music group For KING & COUNTRY in their music video "Burn the Ships". She also appeared in the music video for rapper Macklemore's "Can't Hold Us".

See also
USS Lady Washington (1776)

References

External links

Grays Harbor Historical Seaport Authority, Lady Washingtons operating organization
Maritime Heritage Network, an online directory of maritime history resources in the Pacific Northwest

Replica ships
Individual sailing vessels
Sail training ships
Tall ships of the United States
Shipwrecks in the Philippine Sea
Brigs
1989 ships
Exploration ships
Privateer ships of the United States
Fur trade
Symbols of Washington (state)